Agra Lok Sabha constituency is one of the 80 Lok Sabha (parliamentary) constituencies in the Indian state of Uttar Pradesh.

Assembly segments
Presently, Agra Lok Sabha constituency comprises five Vidhan Sabha (legislative assembly) segments.

Members of Parliament

Election results

2019

2014

2009
Percentage changes are based on numbers from the 2004 elections.

2004

See also
 Agra district
 List of Constituencies of the Lok Sabha
 Agra (Graduates constituency)

Notes

Lok Sabha constituencies in Uttar Pradesh
Politics of Agra district